Leopard is the name of a British double stage experimental rocket, which was launched between 1959 and 1962 eleven times from Aberporth. The Leopard has a flight altitude of 20 kilometres, a launch mass of 1.5 tons and a length of 6 metres.

https://web.archive.org/web/20050309014028/http://www.astronautix.com/lvs/leopard.htm

Rockets and missiles